William Joseph Bogaard (born 1938) is an American politician, and the former mayor of Pasadena, California.

Early life 
On January 18, 1938, Bogaard was born in Sioux City, Iowa.

Career 
Bogaard is a member of the Democratic Party. He was first elected mayor in 1999, and was reelected with an overwhelming majority of the vote (over 85%) in 2003. Bogaard was the first elected mayor of Pasadena since the 1940s and the longest-serving mayor in Pasadena's history.

Prior to being elected mayor, Bogaard was a lawyer, and taught at the University of Michigan and the University of Southern California. He graduated from Loyola Marymount University and was a captain in the U.S. Air Force. He obtained his Juris Doctor degree from the University of Michigan.

In 2007, Bogaard sought reelection for a third term as mayor. His opponent was Aaron Proctor.  The election was held on March 6, and Bogaard won easily, getting 11,558 votes (88.7% of the vote).

In 2011, Bogaard ran unopposed, receiving 12,202 votes.

He has served on the board of directors of the League of California Cities since 2007, and was elected as president of the board  on September 7, 2012.

Personal life
Bogaard married Claire M. Whalen on January 28, 1961, in San Francisco, California.
In 1971, Bogaard and his wife moved to Pasadena, California. They have four children. Michele Bogaard, Matt Bogaard Jeannine Bogaard and Joseph Bogaard

Electoral history

1999

2003

2007

 Proctor ran as "decline to state" as he did not join the Republican Party until late 2007.

2011

References

Additional sources 
 
 

1938 births
Living people
Politicians from Sioux City, Iowa
University of Michigan Law School alumni
University of Michigan faculty
University of Southern California faculty
California Democrats
Mayors of Pasadena, California
California city council members
Loyola Marymount University alumni